This article lists compositions written for the viola.  The list includes works in which the viola is a featured instrument: viola solo, viola and piano, viola and orchestra, ensemble of violas, etc.  Catalogue number, date of composition and publisher (for copyrighted works) are also included.  Ordering is by composer surname.

This pages lists composers whose surname falls into the O to R alphabetic range.  For others, see respective pages:
 List of compositions for viola: A to B
 List of compositions for viola: C to E
 List of compositions for viola: F to H
 List of compositions for viola: I to K
 List of compositions for viola: L to N
 List of compositions for viola: S
 List of compositions for viola: T to Z

O
 Charles Oberthür (1819–1895)
     Le pauvre Savoyarde (The Poor Savoyard) or Le pauvre petite Savoyarde, Romance for viola and harp (or piano), Op. 119 (1855)
 Jana Obrovská (1930–1987)
     Concertino for violin, viola, double bass and string orchestra (1981); Český Hudební Fond
     Smutek sluší viole (Sadness Suits the Viola), Fantasie for viola and chamber orchestra (1978); Český Hudební Fond
 Irina Odăgescu-Țuțuianu (b. 1937)
     Melos, Sonata for viola solo, Op. 48 (1982); Editura Muzicală
 Helmut Oehring (b. 1961)
     Plath, S. for 2 violas (or other instruments) (1998)
     Sexton A. for viola solo (1996); Bote & Bock; Boosey & Hawkes
 Michael Oesterle (b. 1968)
     Big City, little city for solo viola and chamber ensemble (2007)
     Chaucer Canticles for 2 sopranos, 2 percussionists and viola (2003)
 Will Ogdon (1921–2013)
     Variation Suite for violin and viola (1995–1996); Association for the Promotion of New Music
 Eduard Oja (1905–1950)
     Melanhoolsed öökullid (Melancholic Owls) for viola and piano (1937)
 Eoin O'Keeffe (b. 1979)
     Trio and Over Again for flute, viola and harp (2005); Contemporary Music Centre Ireland
 Mehmet Okonşar (b. 1961)
     Ahmet Taner Kışlalı Anısına (Ahmet Taner Kışlalı In Memoriam) for viola solo (2004)
     Kaleidoscope No. 3 for viola and piano (2006)
 Kjartan Ólafsson (b. 1958)
     Concerto for viola and orchestra (1995); Íslenzk Tónverkamiðstöð
     Dimma (Dusk) for viola and piano (1985); Íslenzk Tónverkamiðstöð
 Jane O'Leary (b. 1946)
     Why the Hill Sings for viola and piano (2004); Contemporary Music Centre Ireland
 Vivienne Olive (b. 1950)
     And the Willows Drowse and Sleep for flute, viola and harp (2002); Furore Verlag
     At All, at All ... for 3 mezzo-sopranos and 3 violas (1971); Furore Verlag
     Pantjelang Lullaby for viola and cello (1995); Furore Verlag
     Rondel for viola and piano (1979); Tonos International Music Editions
 John Oliver (b. 1959)
     A Dream of Africa for viola and guitar (2006, 2007)
     New Bloom for flute, violin and viola (1988)
     3 Trains for viola and piano (2000); Canadian Music Centre
     Sonare 1 for viola solo (1982, revised 1992); Canadian Music Centre
 Juan Oliver y Astorga (1733–1830)
     Sonata No. 1 in C minor for viola and basso continuo (1803); Cornetto-Verlag
     Sonata No. 2 in G major for viola and basso continuo (1804); Cornetto-Verlag
     Sonata No. 3 in F minor for viola and basso continuo (1804); Cornetto-Verlag
     Sonata No. 4 in C major for viola and basso continuo (1805); Cornetto-Verlag
     Sonata No. 5 in C minor for viola and basso continuo (1807)
 Betty Olivero (b. 1954)
     Neharót Neharót (נהרות, נהרות) for solo viola, accordion, percussion, 2 string orchestras and tape (2006–2007); Israel Music Institute
     Per Viola (לויולה) for viola solo (1993); Israel Music Institute
 Sparre Olsen (1903–1984)
     Norsk kjærleikssong (Norwegian Love Song) for viola or cello and piano, Op. 36 No. 3 (1946); Norsk Musikforlag
     Tre Dialoger (Three Dialogues) for flute and viola, Op. 50 (1976); Musikk-Huset Forlag
 George Onslow (1784–1853)
     Sonata in F major for viola and piano, Op. 16 No. 1 (1819); original for cello and piano
     Sonata in C minor for viola and piano, Op. 16 No. 2 (1819); original for cello and piano
     Sonata in A major for viola and piano, Op. 16 No. 3 (1819); original for cello and piano
 György Orbán (b. 1947)
     Sonata for viola and piano (1997)
 Ben-Zion Orgad (1926–2006)
     Monologue (מונולוג) for viola solo (1957); Israeli Music Publications
 Leo Ornstein (1893–2002)
     Ballade for saxophone (or clarinet, or viola) and piano, S609 (1955); Poon Hill Press
     Two Fantasies for viola and piano, S606-607 (1970s); Poon Hill Press
 Buxton Orr (1924–1997)
     Episodes for English horn or viola and piano (1966); Gamber Press; British Music Information Centre
     Kate's Piece for alto flute and viola (1997); Gamber Press
     Refrains I for English horn or viola and piano (1970); Gamber Press; British Music Information Centre
     Refrains II for clarinet, viola and piano (1971); Gamber Press; British Music Information Centre
 Robin Orr (1909–2006)
     Sicilienne and Chaconne for viola and piano (1949); Hinrichsen Edition
     Sonata for viola and piano (1947); Oxford University Press
 Juan Orrego-Salas (1919–2019)
     A Greeting Cadenza for William Primrose for solo viola, Op. 65 (1970); Frangipani Press; MMB Music
     Mobili for viola and piano, Op. 63 (1967); Peer Music Classical
     Sonata a dúo for violin and viola, Op. 11 (1945); MMB Music
 Jackie Orszaczky (1948–2008)
     Ghost for viola and cello (2005)
 Léon Orthel (1905–1985)
     Sonata for viola and piano, Op. 52 (1964–1965); Donemus
 Nigel Osborne (b. 1948)
     Concerto for viola and orchestra (2008); University of York Music Press
     Transformations 1 "Feminist Theologies" for 2 violas (2007); University of York Music Press
 Michiru Ōshima (b. 1961)
     Concerto Voix de la vie (ヴィオラ協奏曲「命の声」) for viola and orchestra (2009–2010)
     Sonata (ビオラ・ソナタ) for viola and piano (2013)
     In the Kitchen for viola solo (2015); composed for Sylvain Durantel and La Cuisine à l'alto
 Reine Colaço Osorio-Swaab (1881–1971)
     Sonata No. 3 for viola and piano (1952); Donemus
     Suite (Trio No. 1) for flute, violin and viola (1940); Donemus
     Trio No. 3 for 2 violins and viola (1950); Donemus
     Tsaddiék, Intermezzo for viola and piano (1953); Donemus
 Slavko Osterc (1895–1941)
     Sonata for viola and piano
 Willy Ostijn (1913–1993)
     Capriccio for violin (or flute, or clarinet), viola and piano (1965); CeBeDeM
     Elegie for viola and piano (1956); CeBeDeM
     Fata Morgana for clarinet, viola and piano (1952)
     Romanza for viola and piano; CeBeDeM
     Serenata for violin (or viola) and string orchestra (1954); CeBeDeM
     Trio in B minor for violin (or flute), viola and piano (1960); CeBeDeM
     Trio "Twilight" for clarinet, viola and piano (1952)
 Otakar Ostrčil (1879–1935)
     Sonatina for viola, violin and piano, Op. 22 (1925); Universal Edition
 David Ott (b. 1947)
     Concerto for viola and orchestra (1989); Lauren Keiser Music Publishing
 Hall Overton (1920–1972)
     Sonata for viola and piano (1959); American Composers Alliance

P
 Luis de Pablo (1930–2021)
     Anatomías for viola solo, 2 clarinets, horn, trombone and harp (2005–2007); Edizioni Suvini Zerboni
     Ex voto for violin and viola (1995); Edizioni Suvini Zerboni
     Monólogo for viola solo (1990–1992); Edizioni Suvini Zerboni
 Giorgio Pacchioni (b. 1947)
     Baroquefantasy No. 2 for viola and piano (1996); Ut Orpheus Edizioni
 Niccolò Paganini (1782–1840)
     Caprice No. 24; arranged for viola and piano by William Primrose; Carl Fischer
     La Campanella; arranged for viola and piano by William Primrose; Edition Schott
     Sonata per la Gran' Viola in C minor for viola and orchestra (1834)
 Christopher Painter (b. 1962)
     Sonata for viola solo, Op. 60 (2011); Oriana Publications
     Sonata for viola and piano, Op. 18 (1986); Vanderbeek & Imrie
 Émile Paladilhe (1844–1926)
     Danse noble (Concertino de violes) for 2 violas (or violin and viola) and cello (1902)
 Johannes Palaschko (1877–1932)
     Alte Meister für junge Spieler: leichte klassische Stücke (Old Masters for Young Players: Easy Classical Pieces); arrangements for viola and piano (published 1930); Edition Schott
     20 Etüden für Viola zur Förderung der Technik und des Vortrags (20 Viola Studies for Technical Advancement and Performance) for viola solo, Op. 36 (1904 or 1905); F. Kistner & C.F. Siegel; International Music Company
     10 Künstler-Etüden (10 Artist Studies) for viola solo, Op. 44 (1907); Wilhelm Zimmerman
     10 Viola-Studien für vorgerückte Spieler (10 Viola Studies for Advanced Players) for viola solo, Op. 49 (1910); C.F. Schmidt; International Music Company
     12 Etüden (12 Studies) for viola solo, Op. 55 (1912); Steingräber; International Music Company
     12 Studi (12 Studies) for viola solo, Op. 62 (1923); G. Ricordi
     15 Studien (15 Studies) for viola solo, Op. 66 (1926); Edition Schott
     15 Studi (15 Studies) for viola solo, Op. 70 (1926); G. Ricordi
     24 Études Mélodiques (24 Melodious Studies) for viola (viola alta) solo, Op. 77 (1927); Alphonse Leduc
     24 leichte melodische Viola-Studien (24 Easy and Melodious Studies for the Viola) for viola solo, Op. 86 (1930); Edition Schott
     25 Studi facili e melodici (25 Easy and Melodious Studies for the Viola) for viola solo in 1st and 3rd positions, Op. 87 (1928); G. Ricordi
     Melodische Etüden (Melodious Studies), 25 Etudes for viola solo, or with optional piano accompaniment, Op. 92 (1929); Simrock
     25 melodische Studien (25 Melodious Studies) for viola solo, Op. 96 (1930); C. Merseberger; Carl Fischer
 Roman Palester (1907–1989)
     Concerto for viola and orchestra (1975–1978); Polskie Wydawnictwo Muzyczne
     Trio for flute, viola and harp (1985)
 Robert Moffat Palmer (1915–2010)
     Sonata for viola and piano (1948); Peer Music
 Juan Pampin (b. 1967)
     Nada for viola and electronic sounds (2006)
 Roxanna Panufnik (b. 1968)
     Canto for viola solo (2018)
 Yiannis Papaioannou (1910–1989)
     Night (Νυχτερινό) for flute, viola and harp (1937)
     Pastorale (Παστοράλε) for flute, viola and harp (1938)
     Romanesca (Ρομανέσκα) for flute, viola and harp (1938)
     Satyricon (Σατυρικόν) for violin and viola (1978); Philippos Nakas Music House
     Trio for flute, viola, guitar (1967)
 Boris Papandopulo (1906–1991)
     Sonata for viola and piano (1963); Saveza kompozitora Jugoslavije
 Gérard Pape (b. 1955)
     For Maurizio for amplified viola (2003)
     Le Fleuve du désir VI (The River of Desire VI) for viola, tape and live electronics (1994); Éditions Musicales Européennes; United Music Publishers
 Jean Papineau-Couture (1916–2000)
     Prouesse for viola solo (1985, revised 1987); Canadian Music Centre
     Trio en quatre mouvements for clarinet, viola and piano (1974); Canadian Music Centre
 Désiré Pâque (1867–1939)
     Sonata for viola and piano, Op. 85 (1915)
     Suite de deux pièces (Romance et Allegro Scherzando) (Suite of 2 Pieces) for viola and piano, Op. 24 (1892); published as Op. 49
     Suite No. 1 for violin, viola and piano, Op. 17 (1891)
     Suite No. 2 for violin, viola and piano, Op. 20 (1892)
     Suite No. 3 for violin, viola and piano, Op. 26 (1893)
     Suite No. 4 in B major for violin, viola and piano, Op. 27 (1893)
     Suite No. 5 for violin, viola and piano, Op. 34 (1896)
 Robert Parris (1924–1999)
     Concerto for viola and orchestra (1956); American Composers Alliance
     Sonata for viola and piano (1957); American Composers Alliance
 Ian Parrott (1916–2012)
     Aquarelle for clarinet or viola and piano (1952); Chester Music
     Duetto for violin and viola (1986)
 Boris Parsadanian (1925–1997)
     Sonata for viola solo (1977)
 Michael Parsons (b. 1938)
     Pentatonic for violin or viola solo (1975, revised 1984); British Music Information Centre
 Arvo Pärt (b. 1935)
     Es sang vor Iangen Jahren (Motette für de la Motte) for alto or countertenor, violin and viola (1984); Universal Edition
     Fratres for viola and piano (1977, 2003) or for viola and chamber orchestra (1997, 2008); Universal Edition
     Spiegel im Spiegel for viola and piano (1978); Universal Edition
     Tabula Rasa, Double Concerto for 2 violins (or violin, viola) and string orchestra with prepared piano (1977); Universal Edition
 Ödön Pártos (1907–1977)
     Agada (אגדה; Legend) for solo viola, percussion and piano (1960); Israel Music Institute
     Concerto No. 1 "Song of Praise" ("שיר תהילה") for viola and orchestra (1949); Israel Music Institute
     Concerto No. 2 for viola and orchestra (1957); Israel Music Institute
     Elegy (אלגיה) for viola and piano (1974); Israel Music Institute
     Shiluvim (שילובים; Fusions) for viola and chamber orchestra (1970); Israel Music Institute
     Invenzione a tre – Homage to Debussy (אינוונציה לשלושה בהוקרה לדביסי) for flute, viola and harp (1977); Israel Music Institute
     Mourning Music ("Oriental Ballad") ("מוסיקת אבל "בלדה מזרחית) for viola and orchestra (1956); Israel Music Institute
     Sinfonia Concertante, Concerto No. 3 for viola and orchestra (1962); Israel Music Institute
     Yizkor (יזכור; In memoriam) for viola and string orchestra (1947); Israel Music Institute
 Thomas Pasatieri (b. 1945)
     Concerto for viola and orchestra (2012)
     Manifesto for viola solo (2012)
     Sonata for viola and piano (1994); Subito Music Publishing; Theodore Presser Company
     Windsongs for voice, viola and piano (1989); G. Schirmer
 Paul Patterson (b. 1947)
     Concerto for viola and string orchestra, Op. 101 (2008–2009); Joseph Weinberger
     Elegiac Blues for viola and piano, Op. 97a (2005); Joseph Weinberger
     Recitativo for viola solo, Op. 62b (1993); Joseph Weinberger
     Tides of Mananan for viola solo, Op. 64 (1988); Joseph Weinberger
 Jiří Pauer (1919–2007)
     12 Duets for viola and cello (1969–1970); Český Hudební Fond
 Alex Pauk (b. 1945)
     Fibro for viola solo (1973); Canadian Music Centre
     Magaru for flute, viola and percussion (1973); Canadian Music Centre
 Stephen Paulus (1949–2014)
     Exotic Etudes for viola and piano quartet (violin, viola, cello, piano) (2000); Paulus Publications
     Seven for the Flowers near the River for viola and piano (1988); Paulus Publications
 Marcus Paus (b. 1979)
     Shostakovich in Memoriam for viola (or violin, or cello) and string orchestra (2006, 2007); Norsk Musikforlag
     Triple Concerto for violin, viola and orchestra (2011)
 Paul Paviour (b. 1931)
     The Dark Island for viola and piano (2012); Wirripang
     4 Duologues for 2 clarinets or 2 violas (1957); Australian Music Centre
     The Girl Friends, Suite for viola and piano (1995); The Keys Press; Australian Music Centre
     Prelude and Hoe Down for viola and piano (2009); Wirripang; Australian Music Centre
 Anthony Payne (1936–2021)
     Amid the Winds of Evening for viola solo (1988); Chester Music
     Paraphrases and Cadenzas  for clarinet, viola and piano (1969); Chester Music
 José Enrique Pedreira (1904–1959)
     Canción de cuna para un infante moribundo (Lullaby for a Dying Child) for cello (or viola) and piano (1954)
 Joseph Pehrson (1950–2020)
     Changing Fantasy for flute, viola and piano (1983); Seesaw Music
     Entélechies, Trio for 2 violas and clarinet (1977); Seesaw Music
     Levitations for viola and piano (2003); Seesaw Music
     Three Musicians for guitar, violin and viola (2002); Josrep Publishing
     Violahexy for solo viola and electronics (2000); Josrep Publishing
     Violarimba for viola and marimba (1988); Seesaw Music
 Ahmad Pejman (b. 1935)
     Sonatina for viola and piano (1966); Doblinger Verlag
 Georgs Pelēcis (b. 1947)
     Austrumu pasakas Ali Baba un četrdesmit laupītāji tēli (Scenes from the Arabian Nights Story of "Ali Baba and the Forty Thieves") for viola and piano (2005); Musica Baltica
 Krzysztof Penderecki (1933–2020)
     Cadenza for solo viola (1984); Edition Schott
     Ciaccona in Memoriam Giovanni Paolo II for violin and viola (or cello) (2005, 2009); Edition Schott
     Concerto for viola and orchestra (1983); Edition Schott
     Sarabande for solo viola (2000, 2009); original from Suite for cello solo; Edition Schott
     Tanz (Dance) for viola solo (2009, 2010); original for violin solo; Edition Schott
     Tempo di valse for viola solo (2004, 2013); original from Suite for cello solo; Edition Schott
 Edmund J. Pendleton (1899–1987)
     Concerto for viola and orchestra (1983)
 Barbara Pentland (1912–2000)
     Duo for viola and piano (1960); Canadian Music Centre
     Variations for viola solo (1965); Canadian Music Centre
 Albert Périlhou (1846–1936)
     Danse rustique, No. 1 from Scènes agrestes for viola (or violin) and piano (c.1923); Éditions Heugel
     Menuet for violin or viola and piano (1913); Éditions Heugel
 Piotr Perkowski (1901–1990)
     Impression for viola and piano (1927, 1980)
     Poéme for viola and piano
 George Perle (1915–2009)
     Preludio, Invention and Ostinato for viola and piano, Op. 15 (1943); Instituto Interamericano de Musicología
     Serenade No. 1 for viola and chamber ensemble (1962); Galaxy Music
     Slow Piece for clarinet and viola, Op. 18
     Solo Partita for violin and viola (one player) (1965); Theodore Presser Company
     Sonata for viola solo, Op. 12 (1942); Instituto Interamericano de Musicología; Peer Music Classical
 Vincent Persichetti (1915–1987)
     Infanta Marina for viola and piano, Op. 83 (1960); Elkan-Vogel; Theodore Presser Company
     Parable XVI for viola solo, Op. 130 (1974); Elkan-Vogel
 Jean-Louis Petit (b. 1937)
     L'équation du silence for viola and piano, Op. 287 (2000)
     Paralipomenes for viola and piano, Op. 335 (2003)
     Premier exercice d'admiration for flute, viola and harp, Op. 283 (1999)
     Zone III for viola solo, Op. 109 (1983)
 Laurent Petitgirard (b. 1950)
     Dialogue for viola and orchestra (2002–2003); Éditions Durand
 Carmen Petra-Basacopol (b. 1926)
     Cântece rituale (Ritual Songs) for violin and viola, Op. 119 (2007); Editura Muzicală
     Confesiuni (Confessions) for viola solo, Op. 132 (2011); Editura Muzicală
     Legendă (Legend) for viola and piano, Op. 113; Editura Muzicală
 Goffredo Petrassi (1904–2003)
     Duetto for violin and viola (1985); RCA Edizioni Musicali
     Violasola for viola solo (1978); Edizioni Suvini Zerboni
 Ivo Petrić (1931–2018)
     Duo Concertante for viola and accordion (2006); Pizzicato Verlag Helvetia
     Fantasia concertante for viola and chamber orchestra (2009–2011)
     Fantasiana, Sonata for viola solo (2008); Pizzicato Verlag Helvetia
     In signo Librae for violin and viola (1996); Pizzicato Verlag Helvetia
     Landscapes for oboe and viola (1995); Pizzicato Verlag Helvetia
     Tako je godel Kurent (Thus Played Kurent), Choreographic Symphonic Poem for viola and orchestra (1976); Društvo Slovenskih Skladateljev
     Trio Labacensis for viola and cello (1981); Društvo Slovenskih Skladateljev
     Trio lirico for clarinet, viola and piano (2000); Pizzicato Verlag Helvetia
     Variacije na Bartókov tema (Variations on a Theme of Bartók) for viola and piano (1954); Pizzicato Verlag Helvetia
 Konstantin Petrossian (b. 1946)
     Sonata for viola solo (1975); Sovetsky Kompozitor
 Elena Petrová (1929–2002)
     Sonata for viola and piano (1966); Panton Praha
 Vilém Petrželka (1889–1967)
     Dvě skladby (2 Pieces) for cello (or viola) and piano, Op. 45 (1947); Panton Praha; Český Hudební Fond
 Allan Pettersson (1911–1980)
     Fantasy for viola solo (1936); Edition Wilhelm Hansen
     Concerto for viola and orchestra (1979); Nordiska Musikförlaget
 Christian Petzold (1677–1733)
     Partita for viola solo; original for viola d'amore; John Markert & Company
 Karel Pexidr (b. 1929)
     Dvě dumky (2 Dumkas) for viola and piano
     Habél Habálín... for baritone and viola (1998); biblical text from Ecclesiastes; Český Hudební Fond
     Májové vidění (Vision of May) for viola and cello
     Pět vizí Alberta Einsteina (Five Visions of Albert Einstein) for violin and viola
     Versunken in ..., 2 Pieces for viola and piano (published 2015); Edition Brendel
 Malcolm Peyton (b. 1932)
     Elegie, Berceuse for solo viola (1978); Association for the Promotion of New Music
     Suite Nocturnale for solo viola (1994); Association for the Promotion of New Music
 Michel Philippot (1925–1996)
     Concerto for viola and/or violin and orchestra (1984); Éditions Salabert
 Burrill Phillips (1907–1988)
     Conversations for violin and viola (1962); Southern Music Publishing
     Dialogues for violin and viola (1963); Southern Music Publishing
     A Rondo of Rondeaux for viola and piano
     Triple Concerto for clarinet, viola, piano and orchestra (1953)
 Ástor Piazzolla (1921–1992)
     Dos Piezas Breve for viola and piano; Tonos Musikverlags
     Le Grand Tango for viola and piano; Edizioni Bèrben
 Václav Pichl (1741–1805)
     6 Duos for violin and viola, Op. 10 (1784)
     3 Duets for viola and cello, Op. 14 (1790)
     3 Duos concertants for viola and cello, Op. 16 (1792)
     6 Duos for violin and viola, Op. 18 (1795)
     3 Sonatas for solo violin with accompaniment of violin or viola, Op. 23 (c.1800)
 John Pickard (b. 1963)
     Chaconne for viola solo (1998); Bardic Edition
 Alexandra Pierce (1934–2021)
     The Norwich Chorale for flute, viola and cello (1976)
     A Red, Red Rose for violin and viola; Seesaw Music 
     White Bongo for flute, viola and harp (1988); Seesaw Music
 Gabriel Pierné (1863–1937)
     Sérénade, Op. 7; arranged for viola and piano by Lionel Tertis; Joseph Williams
 Boris Pigovat (b. 1953)
     Botticelli's "Magnificat" for viola and piano (2010)
     Nigun for viola solo (1997, 2007); Israeli Music Center
     Poem for viola and string orchestra (1988); Israeli Music Center
     Poem of Dawn, Romantic Music for viola and orchestra (2010)
     Prayer for viola and piano (1994) or viola, harp and string orchestra (1995); Israeli Music Center
     Requiem "The Holocaust" for viola and orchestra (1994–1995); Israeli Music Center
     The Silent Music for viola and harp (or piano) (1997); Israeli Music Center
     Sonata for viola and piano (2012)
 Max Pinchard (1928–2009)
     Double Concerto for viola, cello and string orchestra (1970)
     Grand ciel voilé, 2 Pieces for viola and piano (1980); Le Chant du Monde
     L'eau des ombres, 2 Pieces for violin and viola (1976)
     Prélude et petite danse for viola and cello (1966)
 Daniel Pinkham (1923–2006)
     De profundis for mixed chorus and viola with optional organ (1989); words by Thomas Campion; Ione Press; E.C. Schirmer
     Divertimento for trumpet (or flute, or viola) and harp; Ione Press; E.C. Schirmer
     Duo for viola and cello (2001); Ione Press; E.C. Schirmer
     For Solace in Solitude for viola solo (1991); Ione Press; E.C. Schirmer
     Irenicon for clarinet and viola; Ione Press; E.C. Schirmer
     Musette for violin (or viola), cello and electronic tape (1972); Ione Press; E.C. Schirmer
     8 Poems of Gerard Manley Hopkins for baritone or tenor-baritone and viola; words by Gerard Manley Hopkins; Ione Press; E.C. Schirmer
     Sonata for violin and viola (2005); Ione Press; E.C. Schirmer
     Sonata da camera for flute (also playing alto flute) and viola (1986); Ione Press; E.C. Schirmer
     Sonata da chiesa for viola and organ (1988); Ione Press; E.C. Schirmer
     Triple Concerto for violin, viola, cello and string orchestra; Ione Press; E.C. Schirmer
 Matthias Pintscher (b. 1971)
     in nomine, Übermalung (Painting) for solo viola (1999); Bärenreiter
     Janusgesicht for viola and cello (2001); Bärenreiter
     tenebrae for scordatura viola and small ensemble with live electronics (2000–2001); Bärenreiter
 Paul Pisk (1893–1990)
     Ballade for viola sextet (1958); American Composers Alliance; American Viola Society Publications
     Baroque Chamber Concerto for solo viola and chamber orchestra (1953); Peer Music Classical
     Sonata for viola solo (1925)
     Three Movements for viola and piano, Op. 36 (1955); American Composers Alliance
 Walter Piston (1894–1976)
     Concerto for viola and orchestra (1957); G. Schirmer; Associated Music Publishers
     Duo for viola and cello (1949); G. Schirmer; Associated Music Publishers
     Interlude for viola and piano (1941); Boosey & Hawkes
     Partita for violin, viola and organ (1951); Arrow Music Press; Associated Music Publishers
     Souvenir for flute, viola and harp (1967); Associated Music Publishers
 Ildebrando Pizzetti (1880–1968)
     Concerto for viola and orchestra (1955, unfinished)
     Sonata in Fa for viola and piano (1921); original for cello and piano; adapted by Mario Corti; G. Ricordi
 Francisco Llácer Pla (1918–2002)
     Arquitecturas del silencio for viola and double bass, Op. 71 (2001); Piles, Editorial de Música
 Wolfgang Plagge (b. 1960)
     2 Episodes for violin and viola, Op. 25 (1985); Music Information Centre Norway
     The Lonely Heart for viola and piano, Op. 135 (2004); Lindberg Lyd
     Sonata for viola and piano, Op. 30 (1987); Music Information Centre Norway
 Pēteris Plakidis (1947–2017)
     Ēnu dejas (Dances of the Shadows) for viola and piano (2007); Musica Baltica
 Robert Planel (1908–1994)
     Fantaisie for viola and piano (1963); Éditions Alphonse Leduc
 Raoul Pleskow (1930–2022)
     Bagatelles No. 2 for flute, viola and piano (1966); American Composers Alliance
 Mikhail Pletnev (b. 1957)
     Concerto for viola and orchestra (1997)
 Ignaz Pleyel (1757–1831)
     Concerto in D major for viola (or cello) and orchestra, B. 105 (1790); Internationale Pleyel Gesellschaft
     Duo in C major for cello with viola accompaniment, B. 525 (1792)
     3 Duos (3 Grand Duos) for violin and viola, B. 526–528 (1795); published as Op. 68 or Op. 69
     3 Duos for violin and viola, B. 529–531 (1795–1796); published as Op. 30, Op. 44, Op. 46, or Op. 52
     6 Duos for violin and viola, B. 544–549 (1808–1812); published as Op. 4
     Sinfonie concertante in B major for violin, viola and orchestra, B. 112 (1791); published as Op. 35
     Trio in B major for 2 violins and viola, B. 416
 Anthony Plog (b. 1947)
     Four Miniatures for viola and woodwind quintet (1983); Editions Bim
 Alfred Pochon (1878–1959)
     Passacaglia for viola solo (1942); Edition Fœtisch
 Ludvík Podéšť (1921–1968)
     Suite for viola and piano (1956); Státní Nakladatelství Krásné Literatury, Hudby a Umění; Artia, Prague
 Claire Polin (1926–1995)
     Dark Nebulae II: Ma'alot for solo viola and percussion (1981); Seesaw Music
     Pièce d'Encore for solo viola (1976); Seesaw Music
     Serpentine, Lyrical Instances for solo viola and imaginary dancer (1972); Seesaw Music
     Walum Olum for clarinet, viola and piano (1984); Seesaw Music
 Enrico Polo (1868–1953)
     3 Studi-Sonate (3 Etude-Sonatas) for viola solo (1950); Edizioni Suvini Zerboni
 Manuel Ponce (1882–1948)
     Sonata a dúo (Sonate en duo) for violin and viola (1936–1938); Éditions Maurice Senart
 Jocelyn Pook (b. 1960)
     A Storm from Paradise for mezzo-soprano and viola (1989); Chester Music
 Marcel Poot (1901–1988)
    Dialogo for viola and piano (1979); CeBeDeM
    Duo for violin and viola (1962); CeBeDeM
 Doru Popovici (1932–2019)
     Improvizaţii Lirice (Lyric Improvisations) for flute, viola and orchestra, Op. 71 (1982)
     Sonata for 2 violas, Op. 25 (1965); Uniunea Bucharest
 Enno Poppe (b. 1969)
     Filz (Felt) for viola and chamber orchestra (2014); Ricordi
     Fingernagel (Finger Nail) for violin and viola (2009); Ricordi
 David Popper (1843–1913)
     Romance in G major for cello (or viola) and piano, Op. 5 (1887)
 Matan Porat (b. 1982)
     Hands Off for viola and percussion (2009)
     Horo for flute, viola and harp (2010)
 David Porcelijn (b. 1947)
     Shades for flute, violin and viola (1975); Donemus
     Sinfonia Concertante for viola solo, double bass solo, string quintet and large orchestra, Op. 2 (1985–1986); Donemus
 Quincy Porter (1897–1966)
     Blues Lointains for viola and piano (1928); original for flute and piano; adaptation by the composer; American Composers Alliance
     Concerto for viola and orchestra (1948); Associated Music Publishers
     Divertimento for 2 violins and viola (1949); Valley Music Press
     Duo for viola and harp (or harpsichord) (1957); Associated Music Publishers
     Duo for violin and viola (1952–1954); Valley Music Press
     Little Trio, Suite in E major for flute, violin and viola (1928); Valley Music Press; American Viola Society Publications
     Poem for viola and piano (1948); Valley Music Press
     Speed Etude for viola and piano (1948); Valley Music Press; American Viola Society Publications
     Suite for viola alone (1930); Valley Music Press; American Viola Society Publications
 Alberto Posadas (b. 1967)
     Seth for violin and viola (1999); Éditions Musicales Européennes; United Music Publishers
     Tombeau et double for viola solo (2014)
 Francis Pott (b. 1957)
     Tooryn Vannin (The Towers of Man), Sonata for viola and piano (2013)
 Artin Poturlyan (b. 1943)
     Epigraphe, Epistrophes and Epilogue (Епиграф, Епистрофи и Епилог) for violin and viola (2004)
     Melomonologue (Меломонолог) for viola solo (2003)
 Henri Pousseur (1929–2009)
     Flexions IV for viola solo (1980); Suvini Zerboni, Milano
 Anthony Powers (b. 1953)
     Barcarola for viola solo (1987); Oxford University Press
 Ferdinand Praeger (1815–1891)
     Elegy in E minor for viola and piano (1885); American Viola Society Publications
     Lamentation in F minor for viola and piano (1885)
     Morceau in C minor for viola and piano (1888)
     Romanza in C major for viola and piano (1885)
     Sweet Sorrow in F minor for viola and piano (1888)
 Narong Prangcharoen (b. 1973)
     Antahkarana for viola solo (2010)
 Gerhard Präsent (b. 1957)
     Arietta ritmica XV for viola and piano, Op. 15 (1984); Verlag Doblinger
 William Presser (1916–2004)
     A Hymne to God the Father for tenor, viola and piano or organ (1964); Tritone Press
     Prelude and Rondo for viola and piano (1963); Tritone Press; Tenuto Publications; Theodore Presser
     Romance and Scherzo for clarinet, viola and piano (1977); Tenuto Publications; Theodore Presser
     Serenade for flute and viola (1950); The Composers Press; Henri Elkan Music
     Six Songs of Autumn for baritone and viola (1984); Tenuto Publications; Theodore Presser
     Twelve Duets for violin and viola (1979); Tenuto Publications
 André Prévost (1931–2001)
     Improvisation III for viola solo (1976); Doberman-Yppan Music Publishers; Canadian Music Centre
     Sonata for viola and piano (1979); Canadian Music Centre
 Claudio Prieto (1934–2015)
     Sugerencia for viola solo (1973); Arambol
     Sonata No. 5 for viola and piano (1988, revised 1991); Arambol
 Alexander Prior (b. 1992)
     Viola Sonata (2006)
 Alwynne Pritchard (b. 1968)
     Une Mort Héroïque for viola and tape (1993); British Music Information Centre Contemporary Voices
 Sergei Prokofiev (1891–1953)
     The Cat (Кошка) from Peter and the Wolf for viola and piano, Op. 67 (1936); 1962 transcription by Vadim Borisovsky
     Lullaby (Колыбельная) from the oratorio On Guard for Peace (На страже мира) for viola and piano, Op. 124 (1950); 1962 transcription by Vadim Borisovsky
     Kijé's Wedding (Свадьба Киже) from the film Lieutenant Kijé for viola and piano, Op. 60 (1934); transcription by Vadim Borisovsky
     Pieces from Romeo and Juliet (Пьесы из балета "Ромео и Джульетта") for viola and piano, Op. 64; transcriptions by Vadim Borisovsky
          Introduction (Вступление)
          The Street Awakens (Улица просыпается)
          The Young Juliet (Джульетта-Девочка)
          Menuet: Arrival of the Guests (Менуэт: Съезд гостей)
          Dance of the Knights (Танец рыцарей)
          Mercutio (Меркуцио)
          Balcony Scene (Сцена у балкона)
          Carnaval (Карнавал)
          Dance with Mandolins (Танец с мандолинами) for 2 violas and piano
          Romeo and Juliet Meet Friar Laurence (Ромео и Джульетта у патера Лоренцо)
          Death of Mercutio (Меркуцио умирает)
          Morning Serenade (Утренняя серенада) for 2 violas and piano
          Farewell before Parting and Death of Juliet (Прощание перед разлукой и Смерть Джульетты)
 Frank Proto (b. 1941)
     Duo for viola and double bass (2007); Liben Music Publishers
    Reflections for viola, double bass and stereo tape (1979); Liben Music Publishers
     Sonata for 2 violas (2005); Liben Music Publishers
     Soundscapes for solo viola (2004); Liben Music Publishers
     Trio for violin, viola and double bass (1977); Liben Music Publishers
 Ebenezer Prout (1835–1909)
     Romance in F major for viola and piano, Op. 32 (c.1895)
     Sonata in D major for clarinet (or viola) and piano, Op. 26 (1890)
 Anatol Provazník (1887–1950)
     Concert Fantasy for viola and orchestra, Op. 51 (published 1930s)
 Marta Ptaszyńska (b. 1943)
     Elegia in Memoriam John Paul II for viola solo (2005); Polskie Wydawnictwo Muzyczne
 Giacomo Puccini (1858–1924)
     Requiem for chorus, viola and organ, SC 76 (1905)
 David del Puerto (b. 1964)
     Narciso abatido for flute and viola (1985)
     Sequor for flute, viola and guitar (1985)
 Cesare Pugni (1802–1870)
     Serenata in C minor for solo viola accompanied by violin, viola and cello
     Serenata in D major for solo viola accompanied by violin, viola and cello
     Serenata in F major for solo viola accompanied by violin, viola and cello
     Serenata No. 3 in B major for solo viola accompanied by 2 violins, viola and cello
     Terzettino in G major for 2 violins and viola
 John Purser (b. 1942)
     Concerto for viola and string orchestra; Scottish Music Centre
 Eduard Pütz (1911–2000)
     Blues for Benni for viola and piano (1991); Edition Schott
     Frammenti for 4 violas (1986); Edition Tonger
     Meditationen for viola and guitar (1983); Tonos Musikverlag
     Sonata for viola and piano (1981); Tonos Musikverlags
     Traumstück for viola and harp (1989); Edition Tonger

Q
 Fernand Quinet (1898–1971)
     Sonata in C for viola and piano (1928); Éditions Maurice Senart
 Marcel Quinet (1915–1986)
     Concerto for viola and orchestra, Op. 50 (1963); CeBeDeM
     Les caractères for violin and viola, Op. 64b (1968); CeBeDeM
     Sonatina for violin and viola, Op. 55 (1965); CeBeDeM
 José Ignacio Quintón (1881–1925)
     Romanza for viola and piano (1920)

R
 Jaan Rääts (1932–2020)
     Pala kadentsiga (Piece with a Cadenza) for viola and piano (1981)
 Sergei Rachmaninoff (1873–1943)
     Serenade (Серенада) for viola and piano, Op. 3 No. 5; original for piano; transcription by A. Bagrintsev; Declaration of Love: Album of Popular Pieces for Viola and Piano (Страстное Признание: Альбом Популярных Пьес), Muzyka
 Erika Radermacher (b. 1936)
     Alnair und Algenib for viola and piano (1993)
     2 Impromptus for viola solo (1996)
 Miklós Radnai (1892–1935)
     Sonata in D minor for viola and piano (1913); N. Simrock
 Horațiu Rădulescu (1942–2008)
     Das Andere for viola solo, Op. 49 (1983); Lucero Print
     Agnus Dei for 2 violas, Op. 84 (1991)
     Lux Animae II for viola solo, Op. 97 (1996, 2000)
     Intimate Rituals XI for viola and tape, Op. 63 (1985, 2003)
 Michael Radulescu (b. 1943)
     Suonata for viola solo (1985); Doblinger Verlag
 Kaljo Raid (1921–2005)
     Largo for viola and piano (1999); Eres Edition Musikverlag; Canadian Music Centre
 Osmo Tapio Räihälä (b. 1964)
     Håkan Belgiassa (Håkan in Belgium; Håkan en Belgique) for viola and orchestra (2002); Uusinta Publishing Company; Finnish Music Information Centre
 Priaulx Rainier (1903–1986)
     Solo Suite for cello or viola solo (1963–1965); Schott Music
     Sonata for viola and piano (1945); Schott Music
 Nikolai Rakov (1908–1990)
     Story (Рассказ) for viola and piano (1930); Muzgiz
 Imant Raminsh (b. 1943)
     Dialogues for violin and viola (1983); Canadian Music Centre
     Rise Up, My Love, My Fair One for female chorus, viola and piano (1998); Canadian Music Centre
     What Voices in an Unknown Tongue for soprano, mixed chorus and viola (2002)
 Luis Antonio Ramírez (1923–1995)
     Meditación a la memoria de Segundo Ruis Belvis for viola and piano (1973); Seesaw Music Corporation
 Primož Ramovš (1921–1999)
     Aforizmi (Aphorisms) for viola and piano (1961); Edicije Društvo Slovenskih skladateljev
     Concerto for violin, viola and orchestra (1961); Edicije Društva Slovenskih Skladateljev; Breitkopf und Härtel
     Nokturno for viola and piano (1959); Edicije Društva Slovenskih Skladateljev
     Skice (Sketches) for viola and piano (1958); Edicije Društva Slovenskih Skladateljev
     Transformacije (Transformations) for 2 violas and 10 string instruments (1963); Edicije Društva Slovenskih Skladateljev
 Paul Ramsier (1937–2021)
     Road to Hamelin for viola, narrator and orchestra (or piano) (1978, 1986); original for double bass, narrator and orchestra; Boosey & Hawkes
 Wilhelm Ramsøe (1837–1895)
     Romanze for viola and piano
 Shulamit Ran (b. 1949)
     Perfect Storm for viola solo (2010); Theodore Presser Company
 Bernard Rands (b. 1934)
     "...sans voix parmi les voix..." for flute, viola and harp (1995); Helicon Music Corporation
 Behzad Ranjbaran (b. 1955)
     Concerto for violin, viola and orchestra (2009); Theodore Presser Company
 György Ránki (1907–1992)
     Concerto (Brácsaverseny) for viola and orchestra (1978)
 Kurt Rapf (1922–2007)
     Sonata for viola and piano (1995)
     2 Stücke (2 Pieces) for cello or viola and piano (1967)
     Trio for flute, viola and harp (1987)
 Günter Raphael (1903–1960)
     Concertino in D major for viola and chamber orchestra (1941); Breitkopf und Härtel
     Duo in C minor for violin and viola, Op. 47 No. 2 (1940); Bärenreiter
     Duo in A major for viola and cello, Op. 47 No. 4 (1941); Willy Müller, Süddeutscher Musikverlag; Bärenreiter
     Sonata in C minor for solo viola, Op. 7 (1924); Breitkopf und Härtel
     Sonata in G major for solo viola, Op. 46 No. 3 (1940); Bärenreiter
     Sonata in E minor for solo viola, Op. 46 No. 4 (1946); Bärenreiter
     Sonata [No. 1] in E major for viola and piano, Op. 13 (1925); Breitkopf und Härtel
     Sonata No. 2 for viola and piano, Op. 80 (1954); Breitkopf und Härtel
     Sonatina for flute, viola and harp, Op. 65 No. 1 (1948); Breitkopf und Härtel
 Eda Rapoport (1890–1968)
     Chant hébraïque for viola or cello and piano, Op. 13 (1939); Maxwell Weaner Publications
     Poem for viola and piano, Op. 14 (1939); Maxwell Weaner Publications
 Alexander Raskatov (b. 1953)
     Bel Canto for viola, string orchestra and temple gong (2008); Hans Sikorski
     Canti (Канты) for viola solo, Op. 7 (1978); Sovetsky Kompozitor
     Concerto "Path" (Путь; Chemin; Weg) for viola and orchestra (2002); M.P. Belaieff
     Miserere for viola, cello and orchestra (1992); M.P. Belaieff
     Primal Song (Urlied) for viola and 15 strings (1995); M.P. Belaieff
     Six Psalmodies for harp, viola and 15 strings (1990); Hans Sikorski
     Sonata for Yuri Bashmet for viola and piano (1988); Edition Peters
     Songs of Sunset (Sonnenuntergangslieder) for mezzo-soprano, viola and piano (1995); M.P. Belaieff
 Sunleif Rasmussen (b. 1961)
     Sonata No. 1 for viola solo (2016); Edition Wilhelm Hansen
     Rondo: Mantra und Melos for violin and viola (2019); Edition Wilhelm Hansen
 Émile Pierre Ratez (1851–1934)
     Douze pièces pittoresques (12 Picturesque Pieces) for violin (or viola) and piano, Op. 8 (1886); Éditions Alphonse Leduc
     Pièce romantique in C minor for viola and piano, Op. 70 (ca. 1930); Éditions Musicales J. Gras
     Sonata in E for viola and piano, Op. 48 (1907); Breitkopf; Rouart-Lerolle; Salabert
 Karol Rathaus (1895–1954)
     Rapsodie notturna for viola and piano, Op. 66 (1950); original for cello and piano; adaptation by Carl Ebert; Boosey and Hawkes
 Eldon Rathburn (1916–2008)
     Soliloquy for viola solo (1999); Canadian Music Centre
 Mikhail Raukhverger (1901–1989)
     Concerto for viola and orchestra (published 1986); Muzyka
     3 Pieces (3 Пьесы) for viola and piano (1980); Sovetsky Kompozitor
 Elizabeth Raum (b. 1945)
     Persephone and Demeter for violin, viola and orchestra (2004)
     Prayer and Dance of Praise for viola and piano (1996); Canadian Music Centre
     Renovated Rhymes for soprano, viola and piano (1999); words by John V. Hicks; Canadian Music Centre
     Reverie for viola and piano (1987); Canadian Music Centre
     Romance for viola and piano or chamber orchestra (2001); Canadian Music Centre
 Maurice Ravel (1875–1937)
     Pièce en forme de habanera for viola and piano (1907); transcription by Paul-Louis Neuberth
 Irma Ravinale (1937–2013)
     Dialoghi (Dialogues) for viola, guitar and orchestra (1977)
 Alan Rawsthorne (1905–1971)
     Sonata for viola and piano (1937, revised 1953); Oxford University Press
     Suite for flute, viola and harp (1968); Oxford University Press
 Igor Raykhelson (b. 1961)
     Adagio for viola and string orchestra (2002); Éditions Alphonse Leduc
     Concerto in A major for viola and orchestra
     Concerto for violin, viola, piano and chamber orchestra
     Jazz Suite (Джазовая сюита) for viola, saxophone and orchestra (1999)
     Mirage (Мираж) for viola and string orchestra (2006)
     Reflections (Отражения) for violin (or flute), viola and string orchestra (2003); Éditions Alphonse Leduc
     Sonata in A minor for viola and piano (2001)
 Gardner Read (1913–2005)
     Fantasy for viola and orchestra, Op. 38 (1937); Associated Music Publishers
     Plain Water for chorus, viola and piano, Op. 117a No. 1 (1968); Canyon Press
     Poem for viola or horn and string orchestra, Op. 31 (1935); Carl Fischer
     A Shepherd Lone Lay Fast Asleep for chorus, viola and organ (1965); Lawson-Gould Music Publishers
 Ferdinand Rebay (1880–1953)
     Sonata in D minor for viola and guitar; Philomele Editions
 Napoléon Henri Reber (1807–1880)
     Berceuse for viola and piano, Op. 15 No. 5 (c.1840); original from 6 Pièces for violin and piano; transcription by the composer; Éditions Costallat; Éditions Gérard Billaudot
     Valse in F major for viola and piano, Op. 9 No. 4 (1838)
 Herman Rechberger (1947–2022)
     Rotazioni for violin (or viola) solo (1979); Edition Modern
 Martin Christoph Redel (b. 1947)
     Innen-Lieder: Wachendorff-Aphorismen (Inner Songs: Wachendorff-Aphorisms) for viola solo, Op. 67 (2010)
     Rhapsodie for viola and orchestra, Op. 36 (1987); Bote & Bock; Boosey & Hawkes
     Suissesquisses (Swissketches), Duo for violin and viola, Op. 62 (2006–2007); Bote & Bock; Boosey & Hawkes
     Trio for flute, viola and cello, Op. 3 (1965)
 Alfred Reed (1921–2005)
     Rhapsody for viola and orchestra (1956); Charles H. Hansen Music; Boosey & Hawkes
 William Henry Reed (1876–1942)
     Rhapsody in D major for viola and piano (1918); Augener
 William Leonard Reed (1910–2002)
     Fantasy for flute, viola and harp (1934)
     Suite "The Top Flat" for viola and piano, Op. 41 (1947)
 Max Reger (1873–1916)
     Romanze in G major for viola and piano (1901); original for violin and piano; transcription by Hans Sitt (1924)
     Sechs Stücke (6 Pieces) for viola (or violin) and piano (or organ), Op. 47 (1900); arrangement by Eberhard Werdin from Sechs Orgeltrios (6 Organ Trios) for solo organ; Doblinger Verlag
     Sonata in A major for viola and piano, Op. 49 No. 1 (1900); original for clarinet and piano
     Sonata in F minor for viola and piano, Op. 49 No. 2 (1900); original for clarinet and piano
     Sonata in B major for viola and piano, Op. 107 (1908–1909); also for clarinet and piano
     Suite No. 1 in G minor for viola solo, Op. 131d (1915)
     Suite No. 2 in D major for viola solo, Op. 131d (1915)
     Suite No. 3 in E minor for viola solo, Op. 131d (1915)
     Trio No. 1 in B minor for violin, viola and piano, Op. 2 (1891)
 Theobald Rehbaum (1835–1918)
     Trio-Suite in E minor for violin, viola and piano, Op. 23 (1884)
 Bernard Reichel (1901–1992)
     Chaconne for viola (or cello) and piano (1985)
     Concerto for viola and orchestra (1956)
     Gib Fried zu unsrer Zeit, O Herr for soprano, viola solo and string orchestra (1980)
     Sonata breve: Gib Fried zu unsrer Zeit for viola solo, flute and 5 strings (1974)
     Sonatina for viola and piano (1946)
     Suite for viola and harpsichord (1963)
     Trio for flute (or oboe), viola and piano (1944)
     Trio for 2 flutes and viola (1938)
     Variations sur le choral "Après la longue et sombre nuit" for viola and piano (1943)
 Aribert Reimann (b. 1936)
     Solo for viola solo (1996); Edition Schott
 Carl Reinecke (1824–1910)
     Phantasiestücke (Fantasy Pieces) for viola and piano, Op. 43 (1857)
     10 kleine Stücke (10 Little Pieces) for viola and piano, Op. 213 (1891); Edition Schott
     Trio in A major for clarinet, viola and piano, Op. 264 (1903)
 Karel Reiner (1910–1979)
     Repliky (Replicas), Trio for flute, viola and harp (1973); Český Hudební Fond
     Sloky (Verses) for viola and piano (1975); Český Hudební Fond; G. Ricordi München
 Otto Reinhold (1899–1965)
     Konzertante Musik for flute, viola and orchestra (published 1950?); Breitkopf & Härtel
     Musik for viola and piano (published 1952); Bärenreiter Verlag
     Trio-Serenade for clarinet, viola and piano (1948)
 Jay Reise (b. 1950)
     La Choumine, Poem for viola and piano (1984); Merion Music; Theodore Presser Company
 Franz Reizenstein (1911–1968)
     Concert Fantasy for viola and piano, Op. 42 (1965–1966); Hinrichsen Edition
     Sonata for solo viola, Op. 45 (1967)
 Josef Rejcha (1752–1795)
     Concerto in E major for viola and orchestra, Op. 2 No. 1
 Paolo Renosto (1935–1988)
     Avant d'écrire for viola and piano (1967); Ricordi
     Fast for 2 violins and viola (1974); Ricordi
     In fondo alla pagina for viola solo (1984)
     Presenza 3 for viola solo (1979); Ricordi
     Scops: Strutture e improvvisazioni for viola and orchestra (1966); Ricordi
 Hermann Reutter (1900–1985)
     Aus dem Hohelied Salomonis (From the Song of Solomon), Concerto Grosso for alto, viola, piano and orchestra (1956); Schott Music
     Cinco Caprichos sobre Cervantes (5 Caprices on Cervantes) for viola solo (1968); Schott Music
     Fünf antike Oden nach Gedichten von Sappho (5 Ancient Odes after Poetry of Sappho) for mezzo-soprano, viola and piano, Op. 57 (1947); Schott Music
     Kleines geistliches Konzert (Little Sacred Concerto) for alto and viola (1953); Schott Music
     Musik for viola and piano (1951); Schott Music
     Solo-Cantata on words of Matthias Claudius for alto, viola and piano (or organ), Op. 45 (1948); Schott Music
 Michèle Reverdy (b. 1943)
     Chimère, Concerto for viola and 18 instruments (1994); Gérard Billaudot
     Les Jeux de Protée for flute, viola and harp (1984); Éditions Salabert
     Rencontres for viola solo (1994); Gérard Billaudot
     Tetramorphie for viola and percussion (1976); Alphonse Leduc
 Peter Reynolds (1958–2016)
     Bell Patterns for viola solo (1988); Welsh Music Information Centre; British Music Information Centre
     Dumpe for viola and piano (1990); Welsh Music Information Centre
 Antal Ribáry (1924–1992)
     Dialoghi (Dialogues) for viola and orchestra (1967)
     Sonata for viola and piano (1958); Editio Musica Budapest
 Alan Richardson (1904–1978)
     Autumn Sketches for viola and piano (1949); Oxford University Press; Comus Edition
     Duo for violin and viola
     Intrada for viola and piano (1939); Oxford University Press; Comus Edition
     Prelude in A and Gavotte in A from Solo Violin Partita in E by Johann Sebastian Bach for viola and piano (1939); Oxford University Press; Scottish Music Centre
     Rhapsody for viola and piano (1977); Comus Edition
     Sonata for viola and piano, Op. 21 (1948); Augener Edition; Scottish Music Centre
     Sussex Lullaby for viola (or cello) and piano (1938); Oxford University Press; Comus Edition
     Three Pieces for oboe, viola and piano (1970s); Comus Edition
     Trio Sonata for viola, bass clarinet and piano (1973); Comus Edition
 Marga Richter (1926–2020)
     Aria and Toccata for viola and string orchestra (1957); EMI Music
     Darkening of the Light for viola solo (1961); Carl Fischer
     Düsseldorf Concerto for flute, viola, harp and small orchestra (1981–1982); Carl Fischer
     Suite for solo viola (1962); Harold Branch Publishing; Carl Fischer
 Nico Richter (1915–1945)
     Serenade for flute, violin and viola (1945); Donemus
     Trio for flute, viola and guitar (1935); Donemus
 Jaroslav Řídký (1897–1956)
     Ukolébavka (Lullaby) for viola and piano, Op. 26a (1932); Edition Sádlo, Praha
     Adagio for viola and piano (1932); Edition Sádlo, Praha
 Alan Ridout (1934–1996)
     Seascapes, 6 Easy Pieces for viola or cello and piano (1991); Associated Board of the Royal Schools of Music
     Whom Time Will Not Reprieve for countertenor and viola (1989); British Music Information Centre
 Godfrey Ridout (1918–1984)
     Ballade for viola and string orchestra (1938); Canadian Musical Heritage Society; Canadian Music Centre
     Ballade II for viola and string orchestra (1980); Canadian Music Centre
 Wallingford Riegger (1885–1961)
     Elegy for viola and piano (1915)
     Lullaby for cello (or viola) and piano (1922)
     Revery for cello (or viola) and piano (1920)
     Variations for violin and viola (or violin and viola ensemble), Op. 57 (1956); Associated Music Publishers
 Vittorio Rieti (1898–1994)
     Pastorale e fughetta for flute, viola and piano (or harpsichord) (1966); General Music Publishing
     Triple Concerto for violin, viola, piano and orchestra (1971); General Music Publishing
 Wolfgang Rihm (b. 1952)
     Canzona for 4 violas (1982); Universal Edition
     Canzona nuova for 5 violas (2006); longer version of Canzona; Universal Edition
     Concerto [No. 1] for viola and orchestra (1979–1983); Universal Edition
     Concerto No. 2 "Über die Linie" IV for viola and orchestra (2000–2002); Universal Edition
     Doppelgesang No. 1 for viola, cello and small orchestra (1980); Universal Edition
     Doppelgesang No. 3 for clarinet, viola and orchestra (2004); Universal Edition
     Fetzen IV for viola and accordion (2004); Universal Edition
     Stabat Mater for viola and baritone (2019); Universal Edition
     Solo e pensoso, 2 Sonnets of Petrarch for baritone (or tenor), viola and harp (2004); Universal Edition
 Dennis Riley (1943–1999)
     Apparitions for flute, viola and harp (1983–1984); C. F. Peters
     Chansons funèbres (in Remembrance of Jacob Druckman on Poems of Emily Dickinson) for mixed chorus and viola (1997); C. F. Peters
     Concertante Music No. 3 for viola and orchestra (1972–1974); C. F. Peters
     Serenade for viola and small orchestra (1988)
     Serenade (based on the opera Rappaccini's Daughter) for viola and orchestra (1996); C. F. Peters
     Variations III for viola solo (1972); C. F. Peters
     Wedding Canticle (Psalmus CXXVII) for baritone and viola, Op. 11B (1967)
     Winter Music for violin and viola (1980–1981); C. F. Peters
 John Rimmer (b. 1939)
     Concerto for viola and orchestra (1980); Waiteata Music Press
     Mahurangi – Place of Importance for solo viola (1992); Catena Press
 João Guilherme Ripper (b. 1959)
     Concertino for viola and string orchestra (1988, 2010); Jeanné Music Publications
     Trio for viola, cello and piano (2007)
 Anthony Ritchie (b. 1960)
     Concerto for viola and orchestra, Op. 64 (1994–1995); Bellbird Publications; Centre for New Zealand Music
     Four Bagatelles for percussion and viola, Op. 106 (2003)
     Meditation for viola and piano, Op112 (2004)
     Three Pieces for viola and guitar, Op. 118 (2005)
     Viola Sonata, Op. 64c (1994–1995); arrangement of the Viola Concerto for viola and piano
 Alexander Ritter (1833–1896)
     Tonstück in D minor for viola and piano (published 1901); Joseph Aibl; Universal Edition
 Hermann Ritter (1849–1926)
     Auf den Wellen (On the Waves) for viola (viola alta) and piano, Op. 27 (published 1878)
     Concert-Phantasie No. 1 in C minor for viola (viola alta) and orchestra or piano, Op. 35 (1886)
     Concert-Phantasie No. 2 for viola (viola alta) and piano or piano, Op. 36
     Dithyrambe for viola (viola alta) and piano, Op. 74 (published 1907)
     Erinnerung an die Alpen (Souvenir of the Alps) for viola (viola alta) and piano, Op. 11
     Erinnerung an Schottland: Phantasie mit Benutzung altschottischer Weisen (Souvenir of Scotland: Fantasy on an Old Scottish Air) for viola (viola alta) and piano, Op. 34
     Gesangsstück in D major for viola (viola alta) and piano, Op. 66
     Nach slavischen Eindrücken (After Slavic Impressions) for viola (viola alta) and piano, Op. 33
        Elegie in G minor
        Introduktion und Mazurka in A minor/C major
     Italienische Suite (Italian Suite) for viola (viola alta) and orchestra or piano, Op. 37
        Barcarole (Venezia)
        Elegie (Roma) in A minor
        Tarantella (Napoli)
     Jagdstück for viola (viola alta) and piano, Op. 17 (published 1883)
     Melodia religiosa for viola (viola alta) and piano
     Rokoko: 2 Vortragsstücke (Rococo: 2 Concert Pieces) for viola (viola alta) and piano, Op. 73 (published 1907)
        Gavotte
        Pastorale und Menuett
     Schlummerlied (Lullaby) for viola (viola alta) and piano, Op. 9
     Spinnerlied (Spinning Song) in B major for viola (viola alta) and piano, Op. 28 (published 1878)
     Ständchen (Serenade) for viola (viola alta) and piano, Op. 70 (published 1905)
      Zwei Stücke (2 Pieces) for viola (viola alta) and piano, Op. 7 (published 1883)
        Idylle
        Elfengesang
     Zwei Stücke (2 Pieces) for viola (viola alta) and piano, Op. 32
        Pastorale und Gavotte in A minor
        Im Traume in G major
     Zwei Stücke (2 Pieces) for viola (viola alta) and piano, Op. 48
        Valse caprice
        Moto perpetuo
     Zwei Stücke (2 Pieces) for viola (viola alta) and piano, Op. 65
        Andante
        Allegretto Scherzando
 Jean Rivier (1896–1987)
     Concertino for viola and orchestra (1935); Éditions Salabert; United Music Publishers
     Doloroso et Giocoso for viola and piano (1969); Éditions Gérard Billaudot; United Music Publishers
 John Donald Robb (1892–1989)
     Concerto for viola and orchestra, Op. 24 (1953)
 Jeremy Dale Roberts (1934–2017)
     Wieglied for viola solo (1999); University of York Music Press
     Hamadryad for alto flute, viola and guitar (2001); University of York Music Press
 Michael Robinson (b. 1933)
     Sonata Movement for viola and piano (1960)
 George Rochberg (1918–2005)
     Sonata for viola and piano (1979); Theodore Presser Company
 Mauricio Rodríguez (b. 1976)
     Crepitum for viola solo (2011)
 Kurt George Roger (1895–1966)
     Irish Sonata for viola and piano, Op. 37 (1939); Francis, Day & Hunter; Alfred Lengnick
     Sonata for viola solo, Op. 79 (1954)
     Suite for viola and piano, Op. 84 (1954)
 Miquel Roger Casamada (1954–2017)
     Nocturn for viola and piano (1980)
 Jean Rogister (1879–1964)
     Adieu (Farewell) for viola and string orchestra (1919); Schott Music
     Concerto in A major for viola and orchestra (1914)
     Fantaisie concertante for viola and orchestra (1910); Édition J. Rogister
     Fantaisie sur un cramignon liégeois for viola and orchestra; Éditions Musicales Bayard-Nizet
     Libellule (Dragonfly), Pièce caractéristique for violin or viola and piano (1919); Edition Schott
     Prélude for viola solo; Éditions Musicales Bayard-Nizet
 Miguel Ángel Roig-Francoli (b. 1953)
     Piezas inviolables for viola and piano (1978)
 Kjell Roikjer (1901–1999)
     Divertimento for flute and viola, Op. 45; Skandinavisk Musikforlag
     Introduktion og tema med variationer (Introduction and Theme with Variations) for viola solo, Op. 29; Skandinavisk Musikforlag
 Alessandro Rolla (1757–1841)
     Adagio e Tema con Variazioni in G major for viola and orchestra, BI 333
     Concertino in E major for viola and string orchestra, BI 328; for viola and full orchestra, BI 546
     Divertimento in F major for viola and string orchestra, BI 330
     Divertimento in G major for viola and orchestra, BI 332
     Duo in F major for viola and cello, BI 326
     6 Duos "Torinese" for 2 violas, WoBI 1–6; Gems Music Publications
     22 Duos for 2 violas, BI 1–22; Gems Music Publications
     78 Duos for violin and viola, BI 33–110; Gems Music Publications
     3 Esercizi (3 Capricci; 3 Caprices) for viola solo, BI 311, 313, 314; Gems Music Publications
     2 Intonazioni for viola solo, BI 310, 312; Gems Music Publications
     Introduzione e Divertimento in F major for viola and orchestra (incomplete), BI 329
     Musica Ridotta for viola solo, BI 316–322; Gems Music Publications
     Rondo in G major for viola and orchestra, BI 331
     Sonata in E major for viola and basso
     Sonata in D minor for viola and basso
     10 Studi-Duetti (10 Etude-Duets) for 2 violas, BI 23–32; Gems Music Publications
     3 Terzettini for 2 flutes and viola
     Trattenimenti Notturni for 2 violins and viola
     Viola Concerto in B major, BI 555 (unfinished)
     Viola Concerto in C major, BI 541; Gems Music Publications
     Viola Concerto in D major, BI 542 (unfinished)
     Viola Concerto in D major, BI 543; Gems Music Publications
     Viola Concerto in E major, BI 544
     Viola Concerto in E major, BI 545; Gems Music Publications
     Viola Concerto in E major, BI 547; Gems Music Publications
     Viola Concerto in E major, BI 548
     Viola Concerto in F major, BI 549
     Viola Concerto in F major, BI 550; Gems Music Publications
     Viola Concerto in F major, BI 551
     Viola Concerto in F major, BI 552
     Viola Concerto in F major, BI 553
     Viola Concerto in F major, BI 554
 Antonio Rolla (1798–1837)
     6 Piccole Pastorale (6 Idylles) for viola solo (1836–1837)
     Variazioni Brillanti in F for viola and orchestra, Op. 13 (1822)
 Johann Georg Röllig (1710–1790)
     Duet in C for 2 violas, Sp. 581; Prima La Musica!
 Fausto Romitelli (1963–2004)
     Ganimede for viola solo (1986); Ricordi
 Lucia Ronchetti (b. 1963)
     Amore, Music Theatre for voice, viola and live electronics (2002)
     Éluvion-Étude for viola and live electronics (1997)
     Il sonno di Atys: Studio da Lully for viola and live electronics (2002–2003)
     La follia for viola and piano (1983)
     Last Desire Cadenza for viola and live electronics (2006)
     Poèmes, Paysages chez Proust for viola and piano (1983)
     Requiem for viola solo (1982, revised 2006)
     A Solo from Last Desire for viola solo (2005)
     Studi profondi for viola solo (1984)
     Studio di dedica for flute and viola (1984)
     Studio di fiori da Egon Schiele for viola and guitar (1986)
     Une leçon de ténèbres for ensemble of 11 violas (1985)
 Julius Röntgen (1855–1932)
     Concerto in A minor for 2 violins, viola, cello and orchestra (1930); Donemus
     Duo in E major for violin and viola (1869)
     Introduction, Fugue, Intermezzo and Finale in C minor for violin, viola, cello and orchestra (1930); Donemus
     Lyrische Gänge (Lyric Journeys), 5 Songs for mezzo-soprano, viola and piano (1926)
     Sonata No. 1 in C minor for viola and piano (1924); Donemus
     Sonata No. 2 in A major for viola and piano (1924–1925); Donemus
     Sonata No. 3 in A minor for viola and piano (1925); Donemus
     Terzetto for flute, violin and viola (1923); Donemus
     Trio in E major for clarinet, viola and piano (1921); Donemus
     Triple Concerto in B major for violin, viola, cello and string orchestra (1922); Donemus
 Willard Roosevelt (1918–2008)
     Five Songs for soprano and viola (1975); American Composers Alliance
     Serenade for oboe, viola and cello (1955); American Composers Alliance
     Song and Dance Suite for oboe, clarinet and viola (1975); American Composers Alliance
     Suite for viola solo (1963); American Composers Alliance
 Guy Ropartz (1864–1955)
     Adagio for viola and orchestra or piano (1899); original for cello and orchestra or piano; transcription by René Pollain; Dupont-Metzner; Rouart-Lerolle et Cie.; Éditions Salabert
 Hilding Rosenberg (1892–1985)
     Concerto for viola and string orchestra, Lyne 107 (1942); revised version for viola and orchestra (1945, 1964); Nordiska musikförlaget
     Concerto No. 1 for violin, viola, cello and string orchestra, Lyne 120 (1946)
     Ett litet stycke (A Little Piece; Nocturne; Adagio funèbre) for viola and string orchestra (or organ, or piano), Lyne 94 (1935, 1937); Edition Suecia
     Symphonie Concertante for violin, viola, oboe, bassoon and orchestra, Lyne 69 (1935)
 Mathew Rosenblum (b. 1954)
     Two Harmonies for viola, percussion and piano/sampler (2011); Plurabelle Music Publishing
 Jakob Rosenhain (1813–1894)
     Sonata in D minor for viola and piano, Op. 98 (published 1886); Breitkopf & Härtel
 Antonio Rosetti (c.1750–1792)
     Viola Concerto in G major, C15
 Niels Rosing-Schow (b. 1954)
     Chamber Concerto for alto flute, viola and orchestra (1986–1987); Edition Samfundet
     Figura for viola and piano (1985); Edition Wilhelm Hansen
     Spectre du temps for flute, viola and harp (2004); Edition Wilhelm Hansen
     Trio for flute, viola and harp (1983); Edition Wilhelm Hansen
 Nikolai Roslavets (1881–1944)
     Sonata No. 1 for viola and piano (1926); completed by Alexander Raskatov; Edition Schott
     Sonata No. 2 for viola and piano (1930); completed by Alexander Raskatov; Edition Schott
 Arnold Rosner (1945–2013)
     Canzona sopra un tema di Monteverdi for brass octet and viola, Op. 38 (1968)
     A Duet for Violas, Op. 94 (1991); Horizon Bay Music
     Minyan for viola and guitar, Op. 124 (2013)
 Bruno Rossignol (b. 1958)
     Interlude Maya for viola and guitar (1997); Éditions Delatour
 Nino Rota (1911–1979)
     Intermezzo in B minor for viola and piano (1945); Ricordi Music Publishing
     Sonata in Sol [No. 1] for viola and piano (1935); Edition Schott
     Sonata No. 2 in C major for viola and piano (1945); Ricordi Music Publishing
 Doina Rotaru (b. 1951)
     Obsessivo for saxophone, viola, pre-recorded sounds and live electronics (2008)
     Umbre (Shadows) for viola, 14 stringed instruments and percussion (1999)
 Paul Rougnon (1846–1934)
     Allegro appassionato in D minor for viola and piano (1916); Editions Combre
     Concertino romantique in D minor for viola and piano, Op. 138 (1895); J. Hamelle
     Fantaisie-Caprice in G major for viola and piano (1922); Alphonse Leduc
     Fantaisie de Concert in G minor for viola and piano (1902); Editions Combre
     Grande Étude de Concert for viola and piano; Editions Combre
     Suite de Concert for viola and piano; Editions Combre
 Christopher Rouse (1949–2019)
     Subjectives X for solo viola (1973); American Composers Alliance
 Albert Roussel (1869–1937)
     Aria for viola and piano or orchestra (1928); original for voice and piano; transcription by Paul-Louis Neuberth (1930); Éditions Alphonse Leduc
     Trio for flute, viola and cello, Op. 40 (1929)
 Simon Rowland-Jones (b. 1950)
     Seven Pieces for viola solo (1979)
     Wiegenlied Variations for viola and piano (2008); Comus Edition
 Alec Rowley (1892–1958)
     Lyric Sonata for cello (or viola) and piano (1929); Stainer & Bell
     4 Pieces for viola and piano (1938); J. Williams, London
        Aubade
        Scherzo
        Rêverie
        Farandole
     Rhapsody for viola and orchestra
 Edwin Roxburgh (b. 1937)
     Duologue for David for 2 violas (2008); United Music Publishers
     Soliloquy 2 for viola solo (2005); United Music Publishers
 Vincent Royer (b. 1961)
     Chinook for viola and tape (1995)
     Chinook II for violin, viola and tape (1996)
     La rivière du silence for violin and viola (2002)
     Lumen for viola and electronics (2003)
     Préludes à "l'Amour fou", 3 Préludes for mezzo-soprano, viola and piano (2011)
 Miklós Rózsa (1907–1995)
     Concerto for viola and orchestra, Op. 37 (1979); Breitkopf & Härtel
     Introduction and Allegro for viola solo, Op. 44 (1988); Broude Brothers Limited
 Edmund Rubbra (1901–1986)
     Concerto in A minor for viola and orchestra, Op. 75 (1952); Alfred Lengnick
     Meditations on a Byzantine Hymn "O quando in cruce" for viola solo, Op. 117 (1962), or for 2 violas, Op. 117a; Alfred Lengnick
     Two Sonnets, Diptych for medium voice, viola and piano, Op. 87 (1956); Alfred Lengnick
 Anna Rubin (b. 1946)
     Hiding Faces, Open Faces for viola, electronic soundtrack and video (1988); AR New Music Publishers
     Viola a Tre for 3 violas (1988); Leisure Planet Music
 Anton Rubinstein (1829–1894)
     9 Salon Pieces (9 Салонных пьес) for viola (or violin, or cello) and piano, Op. 11 (1854)
     Sonata in F minor for viola and piano, Op. 49 (1855)
 Poul Ruders (b. 1949)
     Autumn Collection, 6 Pieces for viola solo (2014); Edition Wilhelm Hansen
     Concerto for viola and orchestra (1993–1994, revised 2013); Edition Wilhelm Hansen
     Romances, 6 Short Pieces for viola and piano (2011); Edition Wilhelm Hansen
 Witold Rudziński (1913–2004)
     Sonata for viola and piano (1946); Polskie Wydawnictwo Muzyczne
 Jeanine Rueff (1922–1999)
     Dialogues for viola and piano (1970); Éditions Alphonse Leduc
 Friedrich Wilhelm Rust (1739–1796)
     Sonata in C major for viola solo, 2 horns and cello
     Sonata in G major for viola solo, 2 horns and cello
 Adolf Ruthardt (1849–1934)
     Trio for oboe, viola and piano, Op. 34 (1890)
 John Rutter (b. 1945)
     O Lord, Thou Hast Searched Me Out for mixed chorus, solo English horn (or clarinet, or viola) and organ (2007); Oxford University Press
 Peter Ruzicka (b. 1948)
     "...den Impuls zum Weitersprechen erst empfinge...", Music for viola and orchestra (1981); Universal Edition
 Jeffrey Ryan (b. 1962)
     Bellatrix for viola solo (2001); Canadian Music Centre
     Fata Morgana for flute, viola and harp (1998); Canadian Music Centre
 Joseph Ryelandt (1870–1965)
     Sonata for viola and piano, Op. 73 (1919); CeBeDeM

References

External links
 Free scores featuring the viola at the International Music Score Library Project

 
Viola O-R